Shahed (Persian شاهد ) may refer to:

 Shahed (name), or Shahd, a given name and surname
 Shahed, Iran, or Shahid, a village in Fars province
 Shahed Aviation Industries, an Iranian aerospace company known for designing military UAVs
 Shahed - Bagher Shahr Metro Station, Tehran County, Iran
 Shahed Metro Station (Shiraz), Iran
 Shahed University, Tehran, Iran

See also
 Shahid (disambiguation)